"El Golem" is a poem by Jorge Luis Borges, part of the 1964 book El otro, el mismo (The other, the self). The poem tells the story of Judah Loew (Judá León) and his giving birth to the Golem. In that poem, Borges quotes the works of German Jewish philosopher Gershom Scholem.

Works by Jorge Luis Borges
1964 poems
Golem
Spanish-language poems
Argentine speculative fiction works